Long is a census-designated place (CDP) in Sequoyah County, Oklahoma, United States. It is part of the Fort Smith, Arkansas-Oklahoma Metropolitan Statistical Area. The population was 363 at the 2000 census.

The post office existed from August 22, 1894, until April 15, 1937, with William J. Webb as the first postmaster. Long had 130 residents per the 1905 Territorial Census. 

The community was named for Cherokee leader Peter Long.

Geography
Long is located at  (35.499104, -94.563038).

Demographics

As of the census of 2000, there were 363 people, 125 households, and 100 families residing in the CDP. There were 140 housing units at an average density of 18.3/sq mi (7.1/km2). The racial makeup of the CDP was 67.77% White, 17.36% Native American, 0.28% Pacific Islander, 0.28% from other races, and 14.33% from two or more races. Hispanic or Latino of any race were 1.10% of the population.

There were 125 households, out of which 41.6% had children under the age of 18 living with them, 64.0% were married couples living together, 7.2% had a female householder with no husband present, and 20.0% were non-families. 16.8% of all households were made up of individuals, and 7.2% had someone living alone who was 65 years of age or older. The average household size was 2.90 and the average family size was 3.22.

In the CDP, the population was spread out, with 30.0% under the age of 18, 6.9% from 18 to 24, 30.3% from 25 to 44, 26.2% from 45 to 64, and 6.6% who were 65 years of age or older. The median age was 35 years. For every 100 females, there were 113.5 males. For every 100 females age 18 and over, there were 101.6 males.

The median income for a household in the CDP was $40,208, and the median income for a family was $41,597. Males had a median income of $26,964 versus $25,625 for females. The per capita income for the CDP was $13,759. About 11.4% of families and 24.5% of the population were below the poverty line, including 42.7% of those under age 18 and 41.4% of those age 65 or over.

References

Further reading
 Foreman, Grant. "Early Post Offices of Oklahoma". Chronicles of Oklahoma 6:1 (March 1928) 4-25. (accessed March 8, 2007)
 Shirk, George H. Oklahoma Place Names. Norman: University of Oklahoma Press, 1987. .

Census-designated places in Sequoyah County, Oklahoma
Census-designated places in Oklahoma
Fort Smith metropolitan area